Marco Balzarotti (born 2 March 1961 in Magenta) is an Italian voice actor. He contributes to voicing characters in anime, cartoons, video games, movies, and other content.

Balzarotti is well known for voicing the character Tuxedo Kamen in the Italian-language version of Sailor Moon. He also provides the voice of the character Asuma Sarutobi in the Italian-language versions of Naruto and Naruto: Shippuden.

He works at Merak Film, Studio Asci, Raflesia, and other dubbing studios in Italy.

Voice work

Anime and animation
 Mamoru Chiba/Tuxedo Mask in Sailor Moon
 Asuma Sarutobi in Naruto
 Asuma Sarutobi in Naruto: Shippuden
 Soutetsu Kazahana in Naruto the Movie: Ninja Clash in the Land of Snow
 Minotaur in Blue Dragon
 Minotaur in Blue Dragon: Trial of the Seven Shadows
 Jack Fenton in Danny Phantom
 Drago in Bakugan Battle Brawlers
 Drago in Bakugan Battle Brawlers: New Vestroia
 Drago in Bakugan: Gundalian Invaders
 Bruce Wayne/Batman in Batman: The Animated Series
 Bruce Wayne/Batman in The New Batman Adventures
 Bruce Wayne/Batman in Batman & Mr. Freeze: SubZero
 Bruce Wayne/Batman in Static Shock
 Bruce Wayne/Batman in Batman: Mystery of the Batwoman
 Bruce Wayne/Batman in Justice League
 Bruce Wayne/Batman in Justice League Unlimited
 Bruce Wayne/Batman in The Batman
 Bruce Wayne/Batman in The Batman vs. Dracula
 Bruce Wayne/Batman in Batman: Gotham Knight
 Bruce Wayne/Batman in Batman: The Brave and the Bold
 Walter Shreeve/Shriek in Batman Beyond
 Mr. Thirsty in Best Ed
 Optimus Prime in Transformers: Animated
 Optimus Prime in Transformers: Prime
 Bald and Tim Marcoh in Fullmetal Alchemist
 Tim Marcoh and Isaac McDougall (Episode 1) in Fullmetal Alchemist: Brotherhood
 Regeena Peterson  in Atomic Betty
 King Randor in He-Man and the Masters of the Universe
 Gideon in Beyblade V-Force
 Coach Barthez in Beyblade G-Revolution
 The narrator in Keroro Gunso
 Cliff in CatDog
 Dr. Stankfoot in Zevo-3
 Banutu Steven Jibolba in Tak and the Power of Juju
 Ultralord, Professor Crankk, and Corky Shimatzu in The Adventures of Jimmy Neutron: Boy Genius
 Kyle in Pokémon Ranger and the Temple of the Sea
 Arceus in Pokémon: Arceus and the Jewel of Life
 Prince Phobos in W.I.T.C.H.
 Buros/Bross in Nurse Angel Ririka SOS
 Tip Top in Roary the Racing Car
 Commantis in Creepy Crawlers
 Dr. Bruce Banner/Hulk in The Incredible Hulk
 Alex Brisbane, Paul McGregor, and Mr. Ishtar in Yu-Gi-Oh!
 Gravekeeper's Chief and The D in Yu-Gi-Oh! GX
 Rex Goodwin in Yu-Gi-Oh! 5D's
 Dr. Faker and Kazuma Tsukumo in Yu-Gi-Oh! Zexal      
 Kuzan/Aokiji, Dalton, Largo, Spandam, Happa, and Wetton in One Piece
 Gasparde in One Piece The Movie: Dead End no Bōken
 Papa in Baron Omatsuri and the Secret Island
 Shadow in Spider Riders
 Takuma Zaizen in Witch Hunter Robin
 Dark Lord in Flint the Time Detective
 Asurada in Future GPX Cyber Formula
 Slaynn in Record of Lodoss War
 Slaynn in Record of Lodoss War: Chronicles of the Heroic Knight
 Katsunoshin Asaka in Fancy Lala
 Teddington Twingersnap in Viva Piñata
 Shū in Legend of Raoh: Chapter of Death in Love
 Daisuke Jigen in Mystery of Mamo (3rd dub)
 Daisuke Jigen in The Castle of Cagliostro (2nd dub)
 D in Vampire Hunter D
 D in Vampire Hunter D: Bloodlust
 William Walter Wordsworth in Trinity Blood
 Wolfgang Krauser in Fatal Fury 2: The New Battle
 Jubei Yagyu in Samurai Shodown: The Motion Picture
 J.B. Morrison in Devil May Cry: The Animated Series
 Mufu in Ninja Scroll: The Series
 Jacques in Scooby-Doo on Zombie Island
 Phantom Virus in Scooby-Doo and the Cyber Chase
 Russell/Dark Skull in Scooby-Doo! and the Legend of the Vampire
 Luis Otero in Scooby-Doo! and the Monster of Mexico
 A. J. Sebastian in Appleseed (OVA)
 Nina's Grandfather in Ultra Maniac
 Porter in The Adventures of Chuck and Friends
 Mordecai in Regular Show
Dio Brando in JoJo's Bizarre Adventure (OVA)

Live action shows and movies
 Farkus "Bulk" Bulkmeier in Mighty Morphin Power Rangers
 Farkus "Bulk" Bulkmeier in Mighty Morphin Power Rangers: The Movie
 Farkus "Bulk" Bulkmeier in Power Rangers Zeo
 Farkus "Bulk" Bulkmeier in Power Rangers Turbo
 Farkus "Bulk" Bulkmeier in Power Rangers in Space
 Farkus "Bulk" Bulkmeier in Power Rangers Lost Galaxy
 Charles Atwood in Just for Kicks (TV series)
 Tyler Steele in VR Troopers
 Gene Taylor in Angela's Eyes
 Ross Morgan in My Babysitter's a Vampire 
 Ross Morgan in My Babysitter's a Vampire (TV series)
 Mr. Howard in iCarly
 The Masked Mutant in Goosebumps (Episode: Attack of the Mutant Parts I and II)

Video Games
 Arcturus Mengsk, Zeratul, and other characters in StarCraft
 Bruce Wayne/Batman and Darkseid in Mortal Kombat vs. DC Universe 
 Bruce Wayne/Batman in Batman: Arkham Asylum
 Bruce Wayne/Batman in Batman: Arkham City
 Bruce Wayne/Batman in Batman: Arkham Origins
 Bruce Wayne/Batman in Batman: Arkham Knight
 Bruce Wayne/Batman in Injustice 2
 Cyril, Flash and Kane in The Legend of Spyro: A New Beginning
 Cyril and Gaul in The Legend of Spyro: The Eternal Night
 Cyril and Chief Prowlus in The Legend of Spyro: Dawn of the Dragon
 Mark Hammond in The Getaway
 Eddie O' Connor in The Getaway: Black Monday
 Optimus Prime in Transformers: War for Cybertron
 Deputy Chief Jim Bravura in Max Payne
 Sergeant James Byrd and Elder Tomas in Spyro: A Hero's Tail
 Sergeant Cross in Need for Speed: Most Wanted
 Kaim Argonar in Lost Odyssey
 Sandman in Spider-Man 3
 Francois Candide in Vanquish
 Prophet in Crysis 2 
 Harry and Mickey Desmond in Mafia II
 Florian Greenheart in Overlord II
 Tom Sheldon and Salvador Mendoza in Just Cause
 Suzaku and Matsunoshin Gohda in Tenchu 2: Birth of the Stealth Assassins

References

External links
 
 
 

1957 births
Living people
People from Magenta, Lombardy
Italian male voice actors
Italian male video game actors